Prateek Jain (born 14 June 1993) is an Indian model, actor and the winner of Provogue MensXP Mister World India 2014. He represented India at Mister World 2014 and was among Top 10 Finalists. In 2015, he won Asian Supermodel Contest held in China. He is the first Indian man to win the Asian Supermodel Contest.

Career
He is an Indian Model and the winner of Mister India World 2014 . Earlier he was an investment banker. He was announced the winner of the first edition of Provouge MensXP Mr World India 2014.He was also named MensXP Mr Iron Man. He represented India at Mister World 2014 pageant held in Torbay, Britain on 15 June 2014 and was among the Top 10 finalists. He is placed 18th in Times Most Desirable Men 2014 polls by Times of India.

Later in 2015, he won Asian supermodel Contest 2015 held in Guilin, China in the month of August. He is the first Indian man to win the said contest.

See also
 Mr India World
 Sushant Divgikar
 Sachin Khurana
 Puneet Beniwal

References

Living people
Indian male models
1989 births
Christ University alumni